Valeriy Alekseyevich Dolinin (25 July 1953 – 15 November 2021) was a Russian rower who had his best achievements in the coxless fours. In this event, he won a world title in 1981 and silver medals at the 1980 Summer Olympics and 1982 World Rowing Championships (with Aleksandr Kulagin, Aleksey Kamkin, and Vitaly Eliseyev), as well as a world title in 1977 and an Olympic bronze in 1976 with other teams.

Dolinin was professor at the faculty of physical education of the Radioelectronics Institute of A. S. Popov, he held a Navy rank of Captain.

References

1953 births
2021 deaths
Russian male rowers
Soviet male rowers
Olympic rowers of the Soviet Union
Rowers at the 1976 Summer Olympics
Rowers at the 1980 Summer Olympics
Olympic silver medalists for the Soviet Union
Olympic bronze medalists for the Soviet Union
Olympic medalists in rowing
World Rowing Championships medalists for the Soviet Union
Medalists at the 1980 Summer Olympics
Medalists at the 1976 Summer Olympics
Rowers from Saint Petersburg